Michael Wayne Gunter (born February 18, 1961) is a former American football running back who played one season with the Kansas City Chiefs of the National Football League. He was drafted by the Tampa Bay Buccaneers in the fourth round of the 1984 NFL Draft. He played college football at Tulsa University and attended Gladewater High School in Gladewater, Texas. Gunter recorded 3,547 yards, 6.2 yards per carry and 37 total touchdowns in his college career. He earned first-team All-Missouri Valley Conference honors as a junior and senior. He was also named the MVC's Offensive Player of the Year in 1983. Gunter was inducted into the Tulsa Golden Hurricane Hall of Fame in 1996.

References

External links
Just Sports Stats
College stats

Living people
1961 births
Players of American football from Texas
American football running backs
Tulsa Golden Hurricane football players
Kansas City Chiefs players
People from Gladewater, Texas